The College of Education, Gindiri is a state government higher education institution located in Mangu, Plateau State, Nigeria. It is affiliated to Ahmadu Bello University for its degree programmes. The current acting provost is Emmanuel Jurte.

History 
The College of Education, Gindiri was established vide Plateau State Edict No. 26 of 1980.

Courses 
The institution offers the following courses:

 Chemistry Education
 Education and Economics
 Business Education
 Education and Geography
 Primary Education Studies
 History
 Fine And Applied Arts
 Cultural and Creative Art
 Education and French
 Early Childhood Care Education
 Islamic Studies
 Education and Mathematics
 Political Science
 Computer Education
 Education and English
 Biology Education
 Hausa
 Christian Religious Studies
 Home Economics
 Integrated Science
 Agricultural Science
 Technical Education
 Computer Education
 Theatre Arts
 Physical And Health Education

Affiliation 
The institution is affiliated with the Ahmadu Bello University to offer programmes leading to Bachelor of Education, (B.Ed.).

References 

Universities and colleges in Nigeria
1989 establishments in Nigeria